The Fisheries Agency (FA) is the agency of the Council of Agriculture of the Taiwan (ROC) responsible for all matters relating to fisheries.

History
In May 1998, the amendment of the Regulation for the Organization of the Council of Agriculture, Executive Yuan and the bill for the Regulation for the Organization of the Fisheries Agency, the Council of Agriculture, Executive Yuan were adopted by the Legislative Yuan and enacted by President Lee Teng-hui on 24 June 1998 for promulgation. The agency was then officially established on 1 August 1998.

On 1 July 1999, the Taiwan Fisheries Bureau of the Department of Agriculture and Forestry of Taiwan Provincial Government was merged with the agency. And also, the Fishery Broadcast Station of the Department of Agriculture and Forestry became an affiliated department of the agency. On 1 August 2000, the Southern Taiwan Office of the agency was established in Kaohsiung. On 29 October 2007, the agency moved its headquarters to Kaohsiung. The Southern Taiwan Office was subsequently renamed to Public Service Center and at the same time, the Northern Taiwan Office was established in Taipei.

Organizational structure
 Planning Division
 Fisheries Regulation Division
 Deep Sea Fisheries Division
 Aquaculture Fisheries Division
 Deep Sea Fishery Research and Development Center
 Personnel Office
 Accounting Office
 Secretariat Office
 Civil Service Ethics Office
 Fishery Radio Station

List of directors
 James Sha (24 June 2008 - 30 December 2014)
 Tsay Tzu-yaw (31 December 2014 -)
 Huang Hong-yen (16 January 2018 -)

Transportation
The agency headquarter office is accessible within walking distance south west from Caoya Station of Kaohsiung MRT, and its Taipei office is accessible within walking distance south east from Chiang Kai-shek Memorial Hall Station of Taipei Metro.

See also
 Council of Agriculture (Taiwan)

References

External links

 

1998 establishments in Taiwan
Executive Yuan
Government agencies established in 1998
Organizations based in Kaohsiung